The New Little Belt Bridge is a suspension bridge that crosses the Little Belt strait between Jutland (Jylland) and the island of Funen (Fyn) in Denmark. The bridge is 1,700 metres long, the main span is 600 metres, the pylons reaching a height of 120 metres, and the maximum clearance from the sea is 44 metres.

The New Little Belt Bridge was built from 1965 to 1970 and was opened by King Frederik IX on 21 October 1970.

The bridge was constructed to alleviate congestion on the Old Little Belt Bridge due to the increasing car traffic between Jutland and Funen. It is a motorway on the E20 bridge with three-lane carriageways as opposed to the single lanes of the old bridge. The bridge has heating in the road deck, so it can be kept free of ice and snow in winter. Passing over Little Belt Bridge is toll-free.

Cultural references
The new Little Belt Bridge is seen at 0:12:11 in The Olsen Gang in Jutland, marking the Olsen Gang's arrival to Jutland.

See also
 List of bridges in Denmark
 List of bridges

References

External links

 The New Little Belt Bridge - Highways-Denmark.com 
 Web camera on the bridge 
 

Bridges in Denmark
Suspension bridges in Denmark
Road bridges in Denmark
Bridges completed in 1970
1970 establishments in Denmark
Connections across the Baltic Sea
Buildings and structures in Fredericia Municipality
Buildings and structures in Middelfart Municipality